Bryan Paterson (born March 16, 1977) is a Canadian politician serving as the 96th and current Mayor of Kingston, Ontario.

Career 

Paterson is an economics professor at the Royal Military College of Canada.

Mayor

Paterson became mayor of Kingston after winning the election on October 27, 2014 with 38.15% of the vote. The first meeting of City Council was on December 2, 2014.

Paterson was re-elected in 2018, then again in 2022.

Controversy 
In 2014, Paterson came under scrutiny when two videos of him discussing the "hyper-sexualization" of youth appeared on social media. In the second video, Paterson notes his desire to "raise up an army for God."

In 2020, Paterson was accused of participating in conversion therapy while serving as a youth pastor at conservative Evangelical church Third Day Worship Centre. Paterson denied "certain claims" made by his alleged victim as "false and inaccurate."

Paterson distanced himself from the church when videos surfaced of Third Day Worship Centre pastor Francis Armstrong giving sermons in which he made discriminatory remarks about the LGBTQ+ community and the Islamic Society of Kingston.

Personal life

Paterson attended Third Day Worship Centre, a church that is non-denominational and evangelical.

References

1977 births
Academic staff of the Royal Military College of Canada
Mayors of Kingston, Ontario
Canadian evangelicals
Living people
People from Newmarket, Ontario